The Washington Mystics are an American professional basketball team based in Washington, D.C. The Mystics compete in the Women's National Basketball Association (WNBA) as a member club of the league's Eastern Conference. The team was founded prior to the 1998 season, and is owned by Monumental Sports & Entertainment (led by Ted Leonsis), which also owns the Mystics' NBA counterpart, the Washington Wizards. The team plays in the Entertainment and Sports Arena in the Congress Heights neighborhood of Washington DC. Sheila C. Johnson, co-founder of BET and ex-wife of Charlotte Sting owner Robert L. Johnson, is the managing partner.

The Mystics have qualified for the WNBA Playoffs in 13 of its 23 seasons of existence, and the franchise has been home to such high-quality players as two-time WNBA MVP Elena Delle Donne, Tennessee standout Chamique Holdsclaw, athletic shooting guard Alana Beard, and nearby Maryland product Crystal Langhorne. Until 2018, the Mystics were the only current WNBA franchise that had never made it to the WNBA Finals. They lost in the semifinals twice, to New York in 2002 and to the eventual champion Minnesota Lynx in 2017. After reaching the WNBA Finals for the first time in 2018, they won their first championship in 2019.

Franchise history

(1998–2004)

The Washington Mystics were one of the first WNBA expansion franchises to be established. In 1998, their first season, they finished with a WNBA worst 3–27 record, despite being led by Olympian Nikki McCray. Although they did not make the playoffs that year, the team had high expectations after drafting University of Tennessee star Chamique Holdsclaw in 1999. Washington improved but again failed to make the playoffs as they finished with a 12–20 record. Holdsclaw would lead the team to the playoffs in 2000, making the playoffs with a record of 14–18, losing to the New York Liberty in a first-round sweep.

After being tied for the worst record in the WNBA in 2001 with a 10–22 record, coach Tom Maher and General Manager Melissa McFerrin both resigned. With the future of the franchise up in the air, Mystics assistant coach Marianne Stanley took over as head coach. With the duo of Holdsclaw and rookie guard Stacey Dales-Schuman, the Mystics made the playoffs in 2002 with a 17–15 record. They would sweep the Charlotte Sting in the first round, but lose to New York again in the Eastern Conference Finals 2 games to 1. This would be the only time the Mystics would win a playoff series until 2017.

In 2003, the Mystics would make a franchise second-worst record in franchise history with a 9–25 record, last in the Eastern Conference.

Rumors of Holdsclaw being unhappy playing in Washington came to a head in 2004 when the Mystics star was sidelined with an unspecified ailment, later revealed to be a bout with depression. With their all-star out, rookie and Duke University standout Alana Beard led a depleted Mystics team to a surprising playoff appearance, the third in Mystics history. They finished the 2004 season at 17–17, but lost in the first round to the Connecticut Sun in 3 games.

Changes in the organization (2005–2007)
The 2005 season saw deep changes in the Mystics organization. Former star Holdsclaw joined the Los Angeles Sparks and the team was sold by Washington Sports and Entertainment to Lincoln Holdings LLC, led by Ted Leonsis. In 2005, the team finished the regular season with a record of 16–18 and failed to make the playoffs.

In 2006, the Mystics posted an 18–16 record thriving under star guard Alana Beard who was drafted in 2004. The Mystics entered the playoffs as the 4th seed. In the first round, Washington was ultimately swept by the Connecticut Sun, the first-seeded team in the East.

The Mystics finished with a 16–18 record in 2007. In a more competitive conference, the team was satisfied by its near-.500 finish. However, at the end of the season, the Mystics had the same record as the New York Liberty. Since the Liberty won the regular-season series against the Mystics, Washington lost the tiebreaker and was eliminated from playoff contention.

At the bottom yet again (2008)

In 2008, the Mystics looked to build on their near-playoff appearance in a tough Eastern Conference. They drafted Crystal Langhorne of Maryland with the 6th pick in the 2008 WNBA Draft. Plagues again by coaches problems, the Mystics fell to the bottom of the East again, finishing only in front of the expansion Atlanta team. The Mystics had gone through 10 coaches in 11 years of existence, the most in the WNBA. The Mystics front office knew it needed to completely clean out the entire coaching and management staff.

Changes, part two (2009–2012)
During the 2008/2009 WNBA off-season, the Mystics released general manager Linda Hargrove (replaced by Angela Taylor) and interim coach Jessie Kenlaw (replaced by Julie Plank). Under the new general manager, underperforming players were waived as new players were signed. With the second pick in the Houston dispersal draft and the 2009 WNBA Draft, the Mystics selected Matee Ajavon and Marissa Coleman, respectively. The Mystics hoped to take advantage of the team changes and finally find consistency in their play.

By the time the season began, the Mystics surprisingly started 3–0. They went 13–18 since the first three games, but their 16–18 record was good enough to reach the playoffs. However, in their playoff comeback, the eventual conference champion Indiana Fever was too much for Washington to handle and the Mystics were swept in the first round. This would be the final season Alana Beard played a game for the Mystics, as she suffered two season-ending injuries in the 2009 and 2010 offseasons, respectively.

The Mystics had their best season ever in 2010. Led by Lindsey Harding, Katie Smith, and Crystal Langhorne, the Mystics took first place in the East with a record of 22–12. However, despite holding a 3–1 edge in regular-season games, they were swept in the first round, including a 24-point blowout in the elimination game, by the eventual WNBA Finals runner-up, the Atlanta Dream.

Prior to the 2011 season, the Mystics made many controversial changes. Coming off their best season in franchise history, many had hoped the team would finally see some consistency; this was not the case.  General manager Angela Taylor could not reach an agreement on a new contract and after head coach Julie Plank refused a request to handle both coach and GM duties which was reported as a cost-cutting measure, Mystics assistant coach Trudi Lacey was named to both positions. When asked if the departure of Plank and Taylor was one of the mistakes she said she had learned from at the 2012 WNBA draft lottery, Mystics owner Sheila Johnson said she couldn't discuss that matter, citing ongoing "human resource issues". After the coach/GM change Harding and Smith both demanded trades to specific teams which were granted (to Atlanta and Seattle, respectively). In addition, starting small forward Monique Currie tore her ACL while playing in Europe in January  and was lost for most of the WNBA season. As a result of this off-season turmoil, the Mystics record in 2011 fell to 6–28 from 22-12 the year before. Alana Beard also left in free agency, leaving Crystal Langhorne at center and not much else.

After an even worse season in 2012 (5–29), Trudi Lacey was fired as the Mystics coach and GM. Although having the best odds of the four teams involved in the lottery held on September 26, 2012 for the 2013 WNBA draft, the Mystics ended up with the 4th pick, missing out on drafting one of the three highly touted players available in the 2013 WNBA Draft; which was Brittney Griner, Elena Delle Donne and Skylar Diggins.

Rebuilding, a bright future (2013–2016)

Despite missing out on a top 3 draft pick, the Mystics remained positive and continued their rebuilding phase while adding some young talent with future potential to their roster. Prior to the 2013 WNBA season, the Mystics drafted Tayler Hill and Emma Meesseman in the 2013 WNBA Draft. After the firing of Trudi Lacey, the Mystics hired Mike Thibault as their new head coach and GM.

In the 2013 WNBA season, the Mystics were 17-17 and made the playoffs losing in the first round.

Prior to the 2014 WNBA season, the Mystics drafted Bria Hartley and Stefanie Dolson in the 2014 WNBA Draft. In the 2014 WNBA season, Meesseman became the starting center for the Mystics. They finished 16-18 and made the playoffs but lost in the first round yet again.

In the 2015 WNBA season the Mystics made a change in their starting line-up by putting Dolson at center and Meesseman at power forward. The Big-women duo would have breakout seasons as they both were selected into the 2015 WNBA All-Star Game. Later on, in the season, the Mystics finished 18-16 and made the playoffs, but were once again a first-round exit.
 
Going into the 2016 WNBA season, the Mystics kept acquiring and developing young talent. They drafted Kahleah Copper in the 2016 WNBA Draft and put Hill in the starting line-up. Hill would have a breakout season, leading the Mystics in scoring with a career-high 15.4 ppg and was second place in voting for the WNBA Most Improved Player award. The Mystics would unfortunately not make the playoffs, finishing with a disappointing 13–21 record but showed signs of promise in the future. Meesseman continued to improve after her breakout season, averaging a career-high 15.2 ppg. Also on September 7, 2016, the Mystics scored a franchise record of 118 points along with 16 three-pointers (another franchise record) in a 118–81 victory over the Chicago Sky.

On September 28, 2016, they won the second overall pick in the 2017 WNBA draft.

The Delle Donne era (2017–present)
During the 2016–17 off-season, the Mystics were busy in the trade market. With enough trade assets, they were determined to make a trade for a superstar player. First, on January 30, the team executed a three-way deal with the New York Liberty and Seattle Storm, sending Bria Hartley and Kia Vaughn to the Liberty and receiving the Storm's #6 pick in the 2017 draft. This proved the prelude to an even larger deal as it freed up cap space to land a superstar on their team. Officially announced on February 2, the Mystics traded Kahleah Copper, Stefanie Dolson and the second overall pick in the 2017 WNBA draft to the Chicago Sky in exchange for 2015 league MVP Elena Delle Donne. Also during the off-season in free agency they would sign three-point specialist Kristi Toliver (who had just won a championship with the Los Angeles Sparks in the previous season), upgrading their roster into a championship contender. However, with Meesseman missing some games due to overseas commitment, and Tayler Hill out with a torn ACL midway through the season, the Mystics were the number 6 seed in the league with an 18–16 record. The Mystics defeated the Dallas Wings 86–76 in the first round elimination game. In the second round elimination game, the Mystics defeated the New York Liberty 82–68, advancing past the second round for the first time in franchise history, coming off a record-setting performance by Toliver, as she drained 9 three-pointers in the win. In the semi-finals, the Mystics were defeated by the Minnesota Lynx in a 3-game sweep, who would go on to win the 2017 WNBA championship.

In the 2018 WNBA season, the Mystics played without their starting power forward Emma Meesseman, who played for Team Belgium in the FIBA World Tournament. The Mystics made some adjustments in their starting lineup to compensate for her absence. One month into the season, Tayler Hill made her return to the team after recovering from her ACL injury, but she was traded a month later to the Dallas Wings in exchange for Aerial Powers. That trade helped the Mystics boost their roster's wing depth. The Mystics finished as the #3 seed in the league with a 22–12 record, receiving a bye to the second round. In the second-round elimination game, they defeated the Los Angeles Sparks 96–64, advancing to the semifinals for the second year in a row. In the semifinals, the Mystics defeated the #2 seeded Atlanta Dream in an intense five-game series, advancing to the WNBA Finals for the first time in franchise history. In the finals, they were swept by the Seattle Storm.

Meesseman returned in the 2019 WNBA season, and her return powered the Mystics towards achieving an unprecedented regular season record of 26–8, leading the entire league in total wins and losses and earning them the top spot in the playoffs.  With a dogged determination to come back to the Finals and high hopes that a Finals title would at last be within their grasp, the Mystics began their playoff run skipping the two single-elimination rounds to a semifinal series against the Las Vegas Aces, just more than a year after Washington and Las Vegas's NHL teams, the Capitals and the Golden Knights, competed in the 2018 Stanley Cup Finals with the former emerging victorious.  The Mystics held off the Aces on the first two home games for an insurmountable 2–0 series lead, before finishing them off in Game 4 after the Aces made a desperate bid to extend the series with a Game 3 defeat.  The Mystics then returned to the Finals against the Connecticut Sun, a team that had the second-best record in the regular season that was no less hungry for a championship, having come a win short of one before.  This time, the Mystics prevailed through five intense games, by winning the odd-numbered ones and losing the even-numbered ones, with the availability and health of playoffs MVP Elena Delle Donne becoming a crucial factor in the outcome.  The Sun were able to tie the series twice by exploiting Donne's early exit in Game 2 due to a back injury, then drawing upon unrelenting resolve and willingness to learn from mistakes after a Game 3 loss to deny the Mystics an opportunity to close the series early on their home court.  The Mystics finally earned their first-ever championship by erasing multiple deficits in the final tiebreaker game, before breaking through in the crucial final quarter to hold on to an 89–78 victory.  Meesseman was honored as the Finals MVP.

Uniforms
1998–2010: white with black and gold outlines at home, dark blue with black and gold outlines on the road.
2011–2012: white with red and blue outlines at home, red with white and blue outlines on the road. Both jerseys display the Inova Health System name on the front.
2013–2014: A new number font was introduced; Inova retained as a jersey sponsor.
2015–present: Inova sponsorship expires, and the team name (home jerseys) and city name (road jerseys) return.
2016: As part of a league-wide initiative for its 20th season, all games featured all-color uniform matchups. The Mystics retired the white uniform for this season in favor of a red jersey, while retaining the blue jersey as its dark-colored uniform.

Attendance leaders

The Washington Mystics led the WNBA in home attendance in the years 1998, 1999, 2000, 2002, 2004 and 2009. To celebrate the fans turning out for games, six banners were hung from the Verizon Center rafters celebrating each year the Mystics were "Attendance Champions."

The banners were mocked for years before Ted Leonsis, CEO of Monumental Sports & Entertainment, announced in a 2010 blog that the banners would be taken down, reasoning that the "only banners we should display revolve around winning a division or conference or league championship."

The Mystics are now highly unlikely to lead the WNBA in attendance, since their current home of the Entertainment and Sports Arena seats only 4,200. It was the league's smallest arena during the 2019 season, the Mystics' first in the facility. For the 2020 season, the ESA was to be the WNBA's second-smallest arena following the offseason move of the Atlanta Dream to the 3,500-seat Gateway Center Arena, but instead had to play in Bradenton, FL. That had to be deferred to 2021.

Season-by-season records

Players

Current roster

Other rights owned

Former players
Nicky Anosike (2011)
Alana Beard (2004–2011)
Kiesha Brown (2002–2005)
Vicky Bullett (2000–2002)
Marissa Coleman (2009–2011)
Kahleah Copper (2016), now a member of the Chicago Sky
Monique Currie (2007–2014)
Stacey Dales (2002–2004)
Stefanie Dolson (2014–2016), now a member of the Chicago Sky
Lindsey Harding (2009–2010)
Bria Hartley (2014–2016), now a member of the Phoenix Mercury
Chamique Holdsclaw (1999–2004)
Asjha Jones (2002–2003)
Zuzana Žirková (2003)
Crystal Langhorne (2008–2013)
Kara Lawson (2014–2015)
Nikki McCray (1998–2001)
Taj McWilliams-Franklin (2008)
Chasity Melvin (2004–2007, 2009–2010), now an assistant coach of the Phoenix Mercury
Coco Miller (2001–2008)
DeLisha Milton-Jones (2005–2007)
Murriel Page (1998–2005)
Nakia Sanford (2003–2010)
Katie Smith (2010), now an assistant coach of the Minnesota Lynx
Nikki Teasley (2006–2007)
Kristi Toliver (2017–2019), now a member of the Los Angeles Sparks
Kia Vaughn (2013–2016), now a member of the Phoenix Mercury

Coaches and staff

Owners
Abe Pollin, owner of the Washington Wizards (1998–2005)
Monumental Sports & Entertainment/Ted Leonsis, owner of the Washington Wizards (2005–present)

Head coaches

General managers
Melissa McFerrin (1998–2001)
Judy Holland-Burton (2002–2005)
Linda Hargrove (2005–2008)
Angela Taylor (2009–2010)
Trudi Lacey (2011–2012)
Mike Thibault (2013–present)

Assistant coaches

Cathy Parson (1998)
Wes Unseld, Jr. (1998)
Melissa McFerrin (1999–2001)
Jenny Boucek (1999)
Tyrone Beaman (2000)
Marianne Stanley (2001, 2010–2019)
Linda Hill-MacDonald (2002–2003)
Ledell Eackels (2002–2003)
Linda Hargrove (2004)
Stephanie Ready (2004)
Marynell Meadors (2005–2006)
Jeff House (2005–2006)
Tree Rollins (2006–2007)
Crystal Robinson (2007–2008)
Jessie Kenlaw (2007–2008)
Lubomyr Lichonczak (2009)
Vanessa Nygaard (2009)
Vicky Bullett (2009)
Trudi Lacey (2009–2010)
Laurie Byrd (2011–2012)
Jennifer Gillom (2012)
Eric Thibault (2013–2022)
Asjha Jones (2020–2021)
LaToya Sanders (2019–Present)
Shelley Patterson (2022–present)

Statistics

Media coverage
All Mystics game are broadcast online through the Monumental Sports Network. Select Mystics games are also broadcast on NBC Sports Washington. Broadcasters for Mystics games are Meghan McPeak and Christy Winters Scott.

All games (excluding blackout games, which are available on ESPN3.com) are broadcast to the WNBA LiveAccess game feeds on the league website. Furthermore, some Mystics games are broadcast nationally on ESPN, ESPN2, CBS, CBS Sports Network and ABC. The WNBA has reached an eight-year agreement with ESPN, which will pay right fees to the Mystics, as well as other teams in the league.

All-time notes

Regular season attendance
 A sellout for a basketball game at Capital One Arena is 20,356.
 A sellout for a game at the Entertainment and Sports Arena is 4,200.

Draft picks
1998 Expansion Draft: Heidi Burge (2), Penny Moore (4), Deborah Carter (6), Tammy Jackson (8)
1998: Murriel Page (3), Rita Williams (13), Angela Hamblin (23), Angela Jackson (33)
1999: Chamique Holdsclaw (1), Shalonda Enis (13), Andrea Nagy (25), Jennifer Whittle (37)
2000: Tausha Mills (2), Tonya Washington (18)
2001: Coco Miller (9), Tamara Stocks (25), Jamie Lewis (41), Elena Karpova (44)
2002: Stacey Dales-Schuman (3), Asjha Jones (4), LaNisha Cartwell (33), Teresa Geter (36)
2003 Miami/Portland Dispersal Draft: Jenny Mowe (8)
2003: Aiysha Smith (7), Zuzana Zirkova (21), Trish Juline (32), Tamara Bowie (36)
2004 Cleveland Dispersal Draft: Chasity Melvin (2)
2004: Alana Beard (2), Kaayla Chones (15), Evan Unrau (28)
2005: Temeka Johnson (6), Erica Taylor (19), Tashia Moorehead (32)
2006: Tamara James (8), Nikki Blue (19), Myriam Sy (33)
2007 Charlotte Expansion Draft: Teana Miller (6)
2007: Bernice Mosby (6), Megan Vogel (19), Gillian Goring (33)
2008: Crystal Langhorne (6), Lindsey Pluimer (19), Krystal Vaughn (33)
2009 Houston Dispersal Draft: Matee Ajavon (2)
2009: Marissa Coleman (2), Camille Lenoir (23), Jelena Milavanovic (24), Josephine Owino (28)
2010 Sacramento Dispersal Draft: Kristin Haynie (6)
2010: Jacinta Monroe (6), Jenna Smith (14), Shanavia Dowdell (18), Alexis Gray-Lawson (30)
2011: Victoria Dunlap (11), Karima Christmas (23), Sarah Krnjic (35)
2012: Natalie Novosel (8), LaSondra Barrett (10), Anjale Barrett (26), Briana Gilbreath (35)
2013: Tayler Hill (4), Nadirah McKenith (17), Emma Meesseman (19)
2014: Stefanie Dolson (6), Carley Mijovic (30), Kody Burke (32)
2015: Ally Malott (8), Natasha Cloud (15), Marica Gajić (32)
2016: Kahleah Copper (7), Lia Galdeira (19), Danaejah Grant (31)
2017: Shatori Walker-Kimbrough (6), Jennie Simms (18), Mehryn Kraker (27)
2018: Ariel Atkins (7), Myisha Hines-Allen (19), Rebecca Greenwell (31)
2019: Kiara Leslie (10), Sam Fuehring (34)
2020: Jaylyn Agnew (24), Sug Sutton (36)
2021: No Draft Picks
2022: Shakira Austin (3), Christyn Williams (14)

All-Stars

1999: Chamique Holdsclaw, Nikki McCray
2000: Chamique Holdsclaw, Nikki McCray
2001: Chamique Holdsclaw, Nikki McCray
2002: Stacey Dales-Schuman, Chamique Holdsclaw
2003: Chamique Holdsclaw
2004: None
2005: Alana Beard
2006: Alana Beard
2007: Alana Beard, Delisha Milton-Jones
2008: No All-Star Game
2009: Alana Beard
2010: Monique Currie, Lindsey Harding, Crystal Langhorne
2011: Crystal Langhorne
2012: No All-Star Game
2013: Crystal Langhorne, Ivory Latta
2014: Ivory Latta
2015: Stefanie Dolson, Emma Meesseman
2016: No All-Star Game
2017: Elena Delle Donne
2018: Elena Delle Donne, Kristi Toliver
2019: Elena Delle Donne, Kristi Toliver
2020: No All-Star Game
2021: Ariel Atkins, Tina Charles
2022: Ariel Atkins

Olympians

2000: Nikki McCray, Chamique Holdsclaw
2016: Leilani Mitchell (AUS)
2020: Ariel Atkins, Tina Charles, Leilani Mitchell (AUS)

Honors and awards

1999 Rookie of the Year: Chamique Holdsclaw
1999 All-WNBA Second Team: Chamique Holdsclaw
1999 Peak Performer (FG%): Murriel Page
2000 Peak Performer (FG%): Murriel Page
2001 All-WNBA Second Team: Chamique Holdsclaw
2002 Coach of the Year: Marianne Stanley
2002 Most Improved Player: Coco Miller
2002 All-WNBA Second Team: Chamique Holdsclaw
2002 Peak Performer (Scoring): Chamique Holdsclaw
2002 Peak Performer (Rebounds): Chamique Holdsclaw
2003 Peak Performer (Rebounds): Chamique Holdsclaw
2005 Rookie of the Year: Temeka Johnson
2005 All-Defensive Second Team: Alana Beard
2005 All-Rookie Team: Temeka Johnson
2006 All-WNBA Second Team: Alana Beard
2006 All-Defensive Second Team: Alana Beard
2007 All-Defensive First Team: Alana Beard
2009 Most Improved Player: Crystal Langhorne
2009 All-Defensive Second Team: Alana Beard
2009 All-Rookie Team: Marissa Coleman
2010 All-WNBA Second Team: Crystal Langhorne
2010 All-Defensive Second Team: Lindsey Harding
2013 Coach of the Year: Mike Thibault
2014 All-Rookie Team: Bria Hartley
2017 All-Rookie Team: Shatori Walker-Kimbrough
2018 All-WNBA First Team: Elena Delle Donne
2018 All-Rookie Team: Ariel Atkins
2018 All-Defensive Second Team: Ariel Atkins
2019 Most Valuable Player: Elena Delle Donne
2019 Finals MVP: Emma Meesseman
2019 All-WNBA First Team: Elena Delle Donne
2019 All-Defensive Second Team: Ariel Atkins
2019 All-Defensive Second Team: Natasha Cloud
2020 All-WNBA Second Team: Myisha Hines-Allen
2020 All-Defensive Second Team: Ariel Atkins
2021 Peak Performer (Points): Tina Charles
2021 All-Defensive Second Team: Ariel Atkins
2021 All-WNBA Second Team: Tina Charles
2022 All-Rookie Team: Shakira Austin
2022 All-Defensive First Team: Ariel Atkins
2022 All-Defensive First Team: Natasha Cloud
2022 Peak Performer (Assists): Natasha Cloud

Hall of Famers

FIBA Hall of Famers

Notes

References

External links

 

 
Women's National Basketball Association teams
Basketball teams established in 1998
Basketball teams in Washington, D.C.
1998 establishments in Washington, D.C.